Yaacov Heller is an Israeli-American sculptor and jewelry designer based in Boca Raton, Florida, who is known for his sculptures of Biblical themes. In 2020, he was the recipient of 22nd Annual Opal Awards by The Rotary Club of Boca Raton.

Early life and artistic career
Heller was born in 1941 in Cleveland, Ohio, as Jack E. Heller into a traditional Jewish family. He studied at the Cleveland Museum of Art and has served in the US Navy.  In 1965, he moved to California, and began to develop a wide range of custom-made gold jewelry.

Heller quickly became friends with some of Hollywood's royalty, creating custom art for them – including earrings for Shelley Winters, paintings and sculptures for Sammy Davis Jr., and a special pendant for the hit show, "The Courtship of Eddie's Father." This pendant was commissioned to Heller by the show's producer, James Komack. Heller created 150 fourteen-karat gold pendants, which represented the "clasped hands logo" of the show. They were given as holiday gifts and worn by a "whos who" on the MGM lot, including Elizabeth Taylor, Elvis Presley, and Bill Bixby amongst many others.

Since the 1970s, Heller has been commissioned to create silver and bronze electroformed-cast representations of Biblical figures. These were given to world leaders including Gerald Ford, King Sobhuza II, Husni Mubarak, Anwar Sadat, and John Vorster.

According to The Boca Newspaper and the Sun Sentinel newspaper, Heller has created a wide range of Judaica statues and busts, and figural statuaries such as the Fiddler on the Roof, Count and Countess de Hoernle, and the Bust of Benjamin Ferencz.

In 2014, Heller was commissioned to create The Garden of Humanity, a memorial which recognizes the six major genocides of the 20th century. It was unveiled April 25, 2015.

On September 7, 2020, the documentary Two Heads Are Better Than One: Making of the Ben Ferencz Bust, starring Ferencz and sculptor Yaacov Heller, world premiered. It was produced by Eric Kline Productions and directed by Eric Kline.

On December 17, 2020, Benjamin Ferencz was decorated with the title of 'Distinguished Honorary Fellow of the ICC' and his bust, created by Heller, was unveiled to be housed permanently at the International Criminal Court in the Hague.

Exhibitions 

 A collection of Heller's Biblical tableaus was displayed at the Peeler Art Center of DePauw University from April to May, 2015.
 The original David and Goliath presented to Gerald Ford is now in the Gerald Ford Library Museum in Grand Rapids, Michigan.

Selected artworks

References

External links 
 
 

Jewish American artists
20th-century American sculptors
1941 births
Living people
21st-century American Jews
21st-century American sculptors